Vysokinsky is a rural locality (a settlement) in Zavrazhskoye Rural Settlement, Nikolsky District, Vologda Oblast, Russia. The population was 299 as of 2010. There are 14 streets.

Geography 
Vysokinsky is located 44 km southeast of Nikolsk (the district's administrative centre) by road. Chegodayevsky is the nearest rural locality.

References 

Rural localities in Nikolsky District, Vologda Oblast